Beli Moumouni Dagano (born 1 January 1981) is a Burkinabé former professional footballer who played as a striker. At international level, he represented the Burkina Faso national team.

Club career
Dagano began his career at Ivorian side Stella Club d'Adjamé, based in Abidjan. In 1999, he moved back to his homeland, with Etoile Filante, before making his move to Europe a year later, with Belgian side Germinal Beerschot. After an impressive season with Germinal, Dagano moved to Genk, where he won the Ebony Shoe and scored 19 goals as the club won the league title for only the second time in its history, before spells in France, with Guingamp and FC Sochaux. While at Sochaux he played as they won the 2007 Coupe de France Final. Dagano scored Sochaux's first goal as they drew 2–2 with Marseille, before winning on penalties. In 2008, he joined Al-Khor. He later left Al Khor for Al Sailiya two years later, but the club was subsequently relegated despite Dagano's impressive goal scoring record.

He rejoined his former club Al-Khor and made his league debut on 18 September, scoring two free-kick goals and securing the victory for his team against newly promoted club Al Jaish.

On 31 January, following Aruna Dindane's exit to Al-Gharafa, Lekhwiya immediately signed Dagano as Dindane's replacement.

On 28 May 2012, Dagano joined newly promoted Qatari club Al-Sailiya for the 2012–13 Qatari season.

International career
Dagano made his international debut in 1998. He was a member of the Burkinabé 2004 African Nations Cup team, who finished bottom of their group in the first round of competition, thus failing to secure qualification for the quarter-finals.

He was the joint top goalscorer of the 2010 FIFA World Cup qualifying campaign with 12 goals along with Fijian striker Osea Vakatalesau.

International goals
Scores and results list Burkina Faso's goal tally first

Honours
Genk
 Belgian First Division: 2001–02

Sochaux
 Coupe de France: 2006–07

References

External links
 

1981 births
Living people
Sportspeople from Ouagadougou
Association football forwards
Burkinabé footballers
Burkina Faso international footballers
Burkinabé expatriate footballers
2000 African Cup of Nations players
2002 African Cup of Nations players
2004 African Cup of Nations players
2010 Africa Cup of Nations players
2012 Africa Cup of Nations players
2013 Africa Cup of Nations players
Beerschot A.C. players
K.R.C. Genk players
En Avant Guingamp players
FC Sochaux-Montbéliard players
Ligue 1 players
Ligue 2 players
Belgian Pro League players
Expatriate footballers in Qatar
Burkinabé expatriate sportspeople in Ivory Coast
Burkinabé expatriate sportspeople in Qatar
Expatriate footballers in Ivory Coast
Expatriate footballers in France
Étoile Filante de Ouagadougou players
Expatriate footballers in Belgium
Al-Khor SC players
Al-Sailiya SC players
Lekhwiya SC players
Al-Shamal SC players
Qatar SC players
Burkinabé expatriate sportspeople in France
Stella Club d'Adjamé players
Qatar Stars League players
21st-century Burkinabé people